Mudhoney (sometimes Mud Honey) is a 1965 Southern Gothic film directed by Russ Meyer. It is based on the novel Streets Paved With Gold by Raymond Friday Locke. The film is a period drama set during the Great Depression. "I got in a little bit over my head," Meyer said about the film. "That's when I thought I was Erskine Caldwell, John Steinbeck and George Stevens all in one."

The film became the inspiration for the name of pioneering Seattle grunge band Mudhoney, formed in 1988. American singer-songwriter Norah Jones' album cover for Little Broken Hearts was based upon a poster for the film.

Plot
In this Depression-era tale, Calef McKinney (John Furlong) is traveling from Michigan to California and stops in Spooner, Missouri, where Lute Wade (Stuart Lancaster) hires him for odd jobs.

McKinney gets involved with Wade's niece, Hannah Brenshaw (Antoinette Christiani). But she is married to Sidney (Hal Hopper), a wife-beating drunk who hopes to inherit his uncle-in-law's money.

Sidney and an eccentric preacher named Brother Hanson (Frank Bolger) plot against McKinney, who finds it difficult to conceal his mysterious past and his growing affection for Sidney's wife.

Sidney winds up burning his farm and attempting to frame McKinney. He rapes and murders the preacher's wife and is killed by the lynch mob.

Cast
Hal Hopper as Sidney Brenshaw
Antoinette Cristiani as Hannah Brenshaw
John Furlong as Calif McKinney
Stuart Lancaster as Lute Wade
Rena Horten as Eula
Princess Livingston as Maggie Marie
Lorna Maitland as Clara Belle
Sam Hanna as Injoys
Nick Wolcuff as Sheriff Abel
Frank Bolger as Brother Hanson
Lee Ballard as Sister Hanson
Mickey Foxx as Thurmond Pate
F. Rufus Owens as Milton

Production
The film was based on a novel, Streets Paved with Gold by Friday Locke.

Reception

Box Office
The film was a financial failure. Meyer later said, "I made a gamble with Mudhoney and I failed. The only reason I made Mudhoney was I was in love with a girl named Rena. I should have not made the film."

Critical
The Los Angeles Times called it "the perfect dirty picture. Unspoiled by either undue sadism or outright nudity... a flawless piece of unintentional camp."

Roger Ebert called the film "Meyer's neglected masterpiece: his most interesting, most ambitious, most complex and longest independent production. He describes it as a case of over-achievement; it was not necessary, or perhaps even wise, he believes, to expend so much energy on a movie that had so little directly exploitable elements." Ebert said "Meyer's visual invention, always dramatic and energetic, has never been better than in this one. From the Hitchcockian opening (bare feet seen in a closeup on intersecting passages) to such Grand Guignol shots as a body falling into a grave from the grave's P. O. V., this is a melodrama taken to obsessed extremes."

See also
List of American films of 1965

References

External links

 
Mudhoney at TCMDB
Mudhoney at Letterbox DVD

1965 films
American black-and-white films
1960s English-language films
Films based on American novels
Mudhoney
American independent films
American sexploitation films
1965 drama films
1965 independent films
1960s American films
Southern Gothic films